The Principles of State and Government in Islam is a book written by Muhammad Asad. It was originally published in 1961 by University of California Press, and a revised edition was published in 1980 by Islamic Book Trust.

Contents
 The Issues Before Us
 Terminology and Historical Precedent
 Government by Consent and Council
 Relationship Between Executive and Legislature
 The Citizens and The Government
 Conclusion

See also
 Timeline of Muhammad Asad's life
 The Message of The Qur'an
 The Road to Mecca
 This Law of Ours and Other Essays

References

External links
 Goodreads Link

1961 non-fiction books
Muhammad Asad
Political manifestos
Islamic theology books